In mathematics, an elliptic boundary value problem is a special kind of boundary value problem which can be thought of as the stable state of an evolution problem. For example, the Dirichlet problem for the Laplacian gives the eventual distribution of heat in a room several hours after the heating is turned on.

Differential equations describe a large class of natural phenomena, from the heat equation describing the evolution of heat in (for instance) a metal plate, to the Navier-Stokes equation describing the movement of fluids, including Einstein's equations describing the physical universe in a relativistic way. Although all these equations are boundary value problems, they are further subdivided into categories. This is necessary because each category must be analyzed using different techniques. The present article deals with the category of boundary value problems known as linear elliptic problems.

Boundary value problems and partial differential equations specify relations between two or more quantities. For instance, in the heat equation, the rate of change of temperature at a point is related to the difference of temperature between that point and the nearby points so that, over time, the heat flows from hotter points to cooler points. Boundary value problems can involve space, time and other quantities such as temperature, velocity, pressure, magnetic field, etc.

Some problems do not involve time. For instance, if one hangs a clothesline between the house and a tree, then in the absence of wind, the clothesline will not move and will adopt a gentle hanging curved shape known as the catenary. This curved shape can be computed as the solution of a differential equation relating position, tension, angle and gravity, but since the shape does not change over time, there is no time variable.

Elliptic boundary value problems are a class of problems which do not involve the time variable, and instead only depend on space variables.

The main example 

In two dimensions, let  be the coordinates. We also define the gradient , the Laplace operator  and the divergence . Note from the definitions that .

The main example for boundary value problems is the Laplace operator,

The function  is known data and the solution  is what must be computed. This example has the same essential properties as all other elliptic boundary value problems.

The solution  can be interpreted as the stationary or limit distribution of heat in a metal plate shaped like , if this metal plate has its boundary adjacent to ice (which is kept at zero degrees, thus the Dirichlet boundary condition.) The function  represents the intensity of heat generation at each point in the plate (perhaps there is an electric heater resting on the metal plate, pumping heat into the plate at rate , which does not vary over time, but may be nonuniform in space on the metal plate.) After waiting for a long time, the temperature distribution in the metal plate will approach .

Nomenclature 

.

For that reason,  is said to be elliptic when  and hyperbolic if . Similarly, the operator  leads to a parabola, and so this  is said to be parabolic.

We now generalize the notion of ellipticity. While it may not be obvious that our generalization is the right one, it turns out that it does preserve most of the necessary properties for the purpose of analysis.

General linear elliptic boundary value problems of the second degree 

Let  be the space variables. Let  be a second degree linear operator. That is,

 (divergence form).
 (nondivergence form)

We have used the subscript  to denote the partial derivative with respect to the space variable . The two formulae are equivalent, provided that

.

 (divergence form).

One may assume, without loss of generality, that the matrix  is symmetric (that is, for all , . We make that assumption in the rest of this article.

We say that the operator  is elliptic if, for some constant , any of the following equivalent conditions hold:

  (see eigenvalue).
 .
 .

An elliptic boundary value problem is then a system of equations like

 (the PDE) and
 (the boundary value).

This particular example is the Dirichlet problem. The Neumann problem is

 and

In general, if  is any trace operator, one can construct the boundary value problem

 and
.

In the rest of this article, we assume that  is elliptic and that the boundary condition is the Dirichlet condition .

Sobolev spaces 

The analysis of elliptic boundary value problems requires some fairly sophisticated tools of functional analysis. There is a subtlety here in that the partial derivatives must be defined "in the weak sense" (see the article on Sobolev spaces for details.) The space  is a Hilbert space, which accounts for much of the ease with which these problems are analyzed.

The discussion in details of Sobolev spaces is beyond the scope of this article, but we will quote required results as they arise.

Unless otherwise noted, all derivatives in this article are to be interpreted in the weak, Sobolev sense. We use the term "strong derivative" to refer to the classical derivative of calculus. We also specify that the spaces ,  consist of functions that are  times strongly differentiable, and that the th derivative is continuous.

Weak or variational formulation 

The first step to cast the boundary value problem as in the language of Sobolev spaces is to rephrase it in its weak form. Consider the Laplace problem . Multiply each side of the equation by a "test function"  and integrate by parts using Green's theorem to obtain

.

We will be solving the Dirichlet problem, so that . This gets rid of the  term, yielding

 (*)

where

 and
.

If  is a general elliptic operator, the same reasoning leads to the bilinear form

.

We do not discuss the Neumann problem but note that it is analyzed in a similar way.

Continuous and coercive bilinear forms 

There are many possible choices, but for the purpose of this article, we will assume that

  is bounded.

(Recall that  when  is elliptic.)

Existence and uniqueness of the weak solution 

If further  is symmetric (i.e.), one can show the same result using the Riesz representation theorem instead.

Strong solutions 

Even more vexing is that we are not even sure that  is twice differentiable, rendering the expressions  in  apparently meaningless. There are many ways to remedy the situation, the main one being regularity.

Regularity 

A regularity theorem for a linear elliptic boundary value problem of the second order takes the form

There is no known simple condition necessary and sufficient for the conclusion of the theorem to hold, but the following conditions are known to be sufficient:

  is convex.

Almost everywhere solutions 

Strong solutions 

In this case,  with the strong definition of the derivative.

Numerical solutions 

While in exceptional circumstances, it is possible to solve elliptic problems explicitly, in general it is an impossible task. The natural solution is to approximate the elliptic problem with a simpler one and to solve this simpler problem on a computer.

Because of the good properties we have enumerated (as well as many we have not), there are extremely efficient numerical solvers for linear elliptic boundary value problems (see finite element method, finite difference method and spectral method for examples.)

Eigenvalues and eigensolutions 

Another Sobolev imbedding theorem states that the inclusion  is a compact linear map. Equipped with the spectral theorem for compact linear operators, one obtains the following result.

Theorem Assume that  is coercive, continuous and symmetric. It has a basis of eigenvectors  and matching eigenvalues  such that

 
 ,
  whenever  and
  for all

Series solutions and the importance of eigensolutions 

via the formula

where

(See Fourier series.)

Implemented on a computer using numerical approximations, this is known as the spectral method.

An example 

Consider the problem

 on 
 (Dirichlet conditions).

The reader may verify that the eigenvectors are exactly

, 

with eigenvalues

The Fourier coefficients of  can be looked up in a table, getting . Therefore,

yielding the solution

Maximum principle 

There are many variants of the maximum principle. We give a simple one.

Theorem. (Weak maximum principle.) Let , and assume that . Then . In other words, the maximum is attained on the boundary.

A strong maximum principle would conclude that  for all  unless  is constant.

References

Further reading 

Mathematical analysis
Partial differential equations
Boundary value problems